Nchanga Stadium is a multi-use stadium in Nchanga North, Chingola, Zambia.  It is currently used mostly for football matches and serves as the home for Nchanga Rangers.  The stadium holds 20,000 people.

It is Owned By Nchanga Rangers Football Club which is Owned by Konkola Copper Mines

Football venues in Zambia
Buildings and structures in Copperbelt Province